The  Chrysler VJ Valiant  is an automobile which was produced by Chrysler Australia from 1973 to 1975. It replaced the Chrysler VH Valiant and was a facelifted and revised version of that model. The VJ series Valiant was the tenth Chrysler Valiant model from Chrysler Australia.

Overview
The VJ Valiant models featured new grilles, round headlights and revised tail lights, along with improved trim and a larger range of colours. A new electronic ignition system was introduced on some models, the first time that this feature had been offered in an Australian built car. The total number of models offered was significantly reduced with Ranger XL, Hemi Pacer, Regal 770 and Charger R/T not carried across from the VH Valiant into the new series. Equipment levels were raised in July 1974 with power assisted front brakes, retractable front safety belts, improved sound deadening, a lockable glovebox and a front stabiliser bar now available on all models other than the utilities.

Model range
The VJ Valiant was introduced in April 1973 and was offered in 4-door sedan, 5-door station wagon, 2-door hardtop, 2-door coupé and 2-door coupé utility body styles in the following models:

 Chrysler Valiant sedan
 Chrysler Valiant Ranger sedan
 Chrysler Valiant Ranger wagon
 Chrysler Valiant Regal sedan
 Chrysler Valiant Regal wagon
 Chrysler Valiant Regal hardtop
 Chrysler Valiant Charger coupe
 Chrysler Valiant Charger XL coupe
 Chrysler Valiant Charger 770 coupe
 Chrysler Valiant utility
 Dodge utility

The Dodge utility was virtually identical to the Chrysler Valiant utility but had a slightly lower level of equipment.

Limited editions
A limited edition Valiant Charger Sportsman model was introduced in August 1974. It was available only in “Vintage Red”, with bold white exterior striping, plaid cloth seat inserts and various other extras. It was fitted with the Hemi 265 engine and a four-speed manual gearbox.  500 examples were produced.

Engines and transmissions
Chrysler Australia's "Hemi 6" straight-six engine was offered in three displacements, 215 cid (3.5 litre), 245 cid (4.0 litre) and 265 cid (4.3 litre). A 318 cid V8 was also offered and a number of Chargers were produced with the 340 cid V8.  A 360 cid V8 replaced the 340 in 1974. 3-speed manual, 4-speed manual, and 3-speed automatic transmissions were offered.

Production and replacement
A total of 90,865 VJ Valiants were built, more than any other Australian Valiant series. Production consisted of 49,198 sedans, 15,241 wagons, 10,509 Chargers, 1,067 hardtops and 14,856 utilities. The VJ Valiant was replaced by the VK Valiant in October 1975.

South Africa
Sold as the Valiant J series, the South African assembled Chrysler Valiant lineup included the Rebel, Rebel 660, Regal, Regal Safari, and the VIP. During 1975 the "J½ series" appeared, first as the VIP only but gradually spreading down the range. Sound deadening was improved, while the Regal sedan also received a new "iso-clamp" rear axle insulator. The Regals also received new seats, while all J½ series Valiants could be recognized by the ventless front door windows.

Chrysler CJ series

Chrysler Australia also produced the Chrysler CJ series, a long wheelbase, luxury model developed from the VJ Valiant.

See also
 Chrysler Valiant
 Chrysler Valiant Charger

References

Cars of Australia
Valiant vehicles
Valiant
Cars introduced in 1973
1970s cars